The Mediterranean Futsal Cup was an international futsal competition, this was the first edition of the competition.

Participating
The following 16 teams, shown with final pre-tournament rankings. 

AFC (3)
  
  
  
CAF (4)
  
  
  
  

UEFA (9)

Draw pots

Pot 1
 (19)
 (20)
 (22)
 (27)

Pot 2
 (54)
 (55)
 (69)
 (55)

Pot 3
 (93)
 (82)
 (61)
 (90)

Pot 4
 (37)
 (80)
 (76)
 (41)

First round

Group A

Group B

Group C

Group D

Final round

Classification 9th–16th

Classification 1st–8th

Matches

Quarter finals

9th-16th

1st–8th

Semifinals

13th-16th

9th-12th

5th-8th

1st-4th

Finals

15th-16th

13th-14th

11th-12th

9th-10th

7th-8th

5th-6th

3rd-4th

Final

Honors 

Topscorer:  Mohamad Estanbolli (17 goals)
Best Goalkeeper:  Mohammed Al-Sharif
Best Player:  Dario Marinovic
Fair-Play Award:

Final standing

See also
Futsal planet

References

Mediterranean Futsal Cup, 2010
2010
Mediterranean Futsal Cup, 2010